Nafadotride is a dopamine antagonist with reasonable selectivity for the D3 subtype (9.6 times selectivity for D3 over D2).

References 

Dopamine antagonists
Pyrrolidines
Carboxamides
Nitriles
Naphthol ethers